Time is a single by Marion released early 1996. It reached number 29 on the UK Singles Chart.

Track listing
All songs written by Harding/Grantham/Cunningham, words by Harding

7" vinyl and CC
 "Time"
 "Chance"

CD
 "Time"
 "Chance"
 "Let's All Go Together (slide mix)"

Personnel
 Jaime Harding - vocals
 Tony Grantham - guitar
 Phil Cunningham - guitar
 Nick Gilbert - bass
 Murad Mousa - drums

Marion (band) songs
1996 songs
Songs written by Phil Cunningham (rock musician)
Songs written by Jaime Harding